George Bork (born February 8, 1942) was an American football player in the 1960s.

The 6–1, 185 pound Bork rewrote the Northern Illinois University football record book with some help from end Hugh Rohrschneider during his junior and senior years at the DeKalb school.  In 1962, Bork broke 14 college passing records ranging from yardage gained to best completions percentage. The following year, he bettered 10 of his own records, tied one and set nine more for a total of 20.  He also set a record of 244 pass completions during the 1963 NIU season.

He was the first college quarterback at any level to throw for 3,000 yards in one season.  Bork first played football at Arlington High School, where he was an all-conference selection.  Offered a basketball scholarship to Michigan, the athlete turned it down because he wanted to play football.

Bork played in 1964 to 1967 with the Montreal Alouettes in the Canadian Football League, while with the Alouettes he worked as a gym teacher at Sir Winston Churchill High School in Ville St-Laurent he then signed with the Chicago Owls of the Continental Football League in 1968.

He was inducted into the College Football Hall of Fame in 1999.

References

External links
 

1942 births
Living people
American football wide receivers
American men's basketball players
American players of Canadian football
Canadian football quarterbacks
Continental Football League players
Montreal Alouettes players
Northern Illinois Huskies football players
Northern Illinois Huskies men's basketball players
People from Mount Prospect, Illinois
Sportspeople from Cook County, Illinois
Players of American football from Illinois
Basketball players from Illinois